Storm FC is a Mongolian sports club that fields female sides in association football and futsal. It currently competes in the  Women's National Football League.

History
The club was founded in 2022. That season, they went on to win the Women's National Football League championship. It went undefeated across eighteen matches with fifteen victories. Team striker Narmandakh Namuunaa won the league Golden Boot that season with eighteen goals in as many matches.

Roster
As of 17 February 2022.

Honours
National League (1): 2022

References

External links
Official Facebook
Eleven Sports channel

Football clubs in Mongolia